The 2016 Go Bowling 400 was a NASCAR Sprint Cup Series race held on May 7, 2016, at Kansas Speedway in Kansas City, Kansas. Contested over 267 laps on the 1.5 mile (2.4 km) asphalt speedway, it was the 11th race of the 2016 NASCAR Sprint Cup season, The race had 16 lead changes among different drivers and six cautions for 30 laps.

Report

Background

Kansas Speedway is a  tri-oval race track in Kansas City, Kansas. It was built in 2001 and hosts two annual NASCAR race weekends. The Verizon IndyCar Series also raced at here until 2011. The speedway is owned and operated by the International Speedway Corporation.

Entry list
The entry list for the Go Bowling 400 was released on Monday, May 2 at 9:56 a.m. Eastern time. Forty cars are entered for the race.

Practice

First practice

Final practice
Jimmie Johnson suffered an engine issue similar to what happened to Kasey Kahne at Phoenix in March. The gremlins were remedied and he returned to the track.

Qualifying

Truex said afterwards that his team "had speed here this weekend for sure and feel pretty good about this car in race trim as too. We feel like we made some mistakes throughout qualifying and it took us a while to figure out this three round deal. Things have really been going well for us and clicking well. I love this race track. We’ve really been able to perform well here.”

Matt Kenseth, who qualified second, said that the "Toyota's had a lot of speed in them" and that he "couldn’t get that last lap I wanted. We got off-balance a little bit at the end. Martin was able to get it. We came up a little short.”

Kurt Busch, who qualified fourth, said he felt good about his car "because we made three spring changes going into that qualifying run. Those are things we wanted to try for the race, and we ran out of practice time to do so.  It's nice that it turned out positive and the pace in qualifying is fast, yes, but the race will be at nightfall whereas we practiced in the daytime. This speed should be right in the middle of what we just ran and what changes we made. I think we're cooking up the right batch (for the race)."

Qualifying results

Race

First half

Start

Under clear Kansas skies, Martin Truex Jr. led the field to the green flag at 7:48 p.m. After 15 laps, he pulled to a three-second lead over Matt Kenseth. Debris in turn 4 brought out the first caution of the race on lap 24. Kyle Busch exited pit road with the race lead. Dale Earnhardt Jr. and Regan Smith were tagged for speeding on pit road and restarted the race from the tail-end of the field.

The race restarted on lap 28. Jamie McMurray was black-flagged on lap 30 after NASCAR deemed his crew made "unapproved adjustments" to the body of the car during his pit stop. Matt McCall, McMurray's crew chief, said he thought NASCAR "called us back in for body modification or something. The Jackman hit the door when he went for the tire, so I don’t know. It’s interesting to me how they enforce stuff.” By lap 40, Busch held a one-second lead over Kurt Busch. The second caution of the race flew on lap 56 for Matt DiBenedetto brushing the wall exiting turn 4. Truex exited pit road with the race lead.

Second quarter
The race restarted on lap 61. Carl Edwards attempted to pit because of a flat tire on lap 82, but was carrying too much speed, overshot the entrance and had to limp back around. The third caution of the race flew on lap 103 for a single-car wreck in turn 2. Rounding the turn, Paul Menard got loose and rear-ended the wall. He would go on to finish 40th. Denny Hamlin was tagged for speeding on pit road and restarted the race from the tail-end of the field.

The race restarted on lap 109. A number of cars began hitting pit road on lap 155. Truex pitted on lap 158 and handed the lead to Joey Logano. He pitted the next lap and handed the lead to Clint Bowyer. He pitted the next lap and handed the lead to Danica Patrick. Truex, on fresher tires, ran down and passed Patrick in turn 3 to retake the lead on lap 163.

Second half

Halfway
Debris on the backstretch brought out the fourth caution of the race with 99 laps to go. Hamlin was tagged for speeding on pit road and restarted the race from the tail-end of the field.

The race restarted with 94 laps to go. A number of drivers began pitting with 57 laps to go. Truex hit pit road with 54 laps to go and handed the lead to Matt Kenseth. Truex came back down pit road because of a loose right-front wheel. The wheel was on crooked because of a jammed bracket behind the wheel. After the race, Truex said he "couldn’t believe it. I went around Turns 1 and 2 and I was like ‘Wheel loose.’ I kept telling myself that maybe it's not me, maybe it's just shaking because it has tape on it or something stupid. It was loose and I knew it right away. Frustrating, but that's how it goes.” Kenseth pitted with 53 laps to go and handed the lead to Logano. He pitted with 52 laps to go and handed the lead to Brad Keselowski. He pitted with 50 laps to go and handed the lead to Tony Stewart. Kyle Busch passed entering turn 3 to retake the lead with 36 laps to go.

Fourth quarter
The fifth caution of the race flew with 34 laps to go after Ricky Stenhouse Jr. rode the wall through turns 3 and 4. Jimmie Johnson was tagged for speeding on pit road and restart the race from the tail-end of the field.

The race restarted with 28 laps to go. The sixth caution of the race flew with 27 to go for a multi-car wreck in turn 3. Threading the needle between Keselowski and Kyle Larson, Hamlin got loose and spun out. Logano, with nowhere to go, t-boned the No. 11 car. Hamlin said afterwards that he "and the No. 2 got loose at the same time, I don’t think there was any contact, but the No. 42 was real close to me on the outside. I was driving in really deep there to try and clear him. Didn’t get him cleared and I knew if I didn’t get him clear then I would’ve put myself in a bad spot. I was just going for it. We’ve got a win and it’s win or nothing with this type of format, so why not go in there and take a chance? Unfortunately, it didn’t work.” Logano said it looked from his point that "the 2 got loose and then the 11 got loose. I was hoping the 11 would come down the hill and when you’re in the smoke you can’t see anything. I hit the wall, so I knew where that was and I just kept riding and riding and hoping the 11 would come down the hill because I couldn’t see and he stayed up there and I got him right in the door. It’s unfortunate…It’s just racing. Things happen sometimes.”

The race restarted with 19 laps to go. Busch held off a late charge by Harvick to score the victory.

Post-race

Driver comments
Busch said afterwards that winning at Kansas was "pretty big – man, there’s been a lot of rough days here at Kansas, that’s for sure. A lot of good ones too, but I just can’t say enough about this team and everyone on this M&M’s Camry. This thing was awesome tonight. At the beginning and middle part of the race we weren’t great, but Adam Stevens (crew chief) and the guys, they just kept working on it.”

Following his second-place finish, Harvick said his car towards the end "got tight, I hit a big piece of debris down there about six or seven laps into the run. From that point on I just got really tight…We overhauled this thing this morning to try to get it close. They did a great job.”

After finishing third, Kurt Busch said his team "battled hard. I was trying to find all the different lines on the track to find speed. We did a lot of things good and to win you’ve got to be great. We are right there, we are knocking on the door, but thanks to Haas Automation, Monster Energy, Chevrolet, everybody at Stewart-Haas it’s a great second and third place finish. We always want to win and we have been doing really good with this Tony Gibson (crew chief) led team.”

Race results

Race summary
 Lead changes: 16 among different drivers
 Cautions/Laps: 6 for 30
 Red flags: 0
 Time of race: 2 hours, 49 minutes and 20 seconds
 Average speed:

Media

Television
Fox Sports covered their sixth race at the Kansas Speedway. Mike Joy, three-time Kansas winner Jeff Gordon and Darrell Waltrip had the call in the booth for the race. Jamie Little, Vince Welch and Matt Yocum handled the action on pit road for the television side.

Radio
MRN had the radio call for the race which will also be simulcasted on Sirius XM NASCAR Radio. Joe Moore, Jeff Striegle and Rusty Wallace called the race in the booth when the field raced through the tri-oval. Dave Moody covered the race from the Sunoco spotters stand outside turn 2 when the field raced through turns 1 and 2. Mike Bagley called the race from a platform inside the backstretch when the field raced down the backstretch. Kyle Rickey covered  the race from the Sunoco spotters stand outside turn 4 when the field raced through turns 3 and 4. Alex Hayden, Winston Kelley and Steve Post worked pit road for the radio side.

Standings after the race

Drivers' Championship standings

Manufacturers' Championship standings

Note: Only the first 16 positions are included for the driver standings.. – Driver has clinched a Chase position.

References

Go Bowling 400
Go Bowling 400
NASCAR races at Kansas Speedway
Go Bowling 400